Chinese rhubarb can mean either of two species of rhubarb, genus Rheum:

Rheum palmatum Linnaeus 1759, also known as Turkey rhubarb, East Indian rhubarb, or palmate rhubarb
Rheum officinale Baillon 1871, also known as Indian rhubarb, Tibetan rhubarb, or medicinal rhubarb